Dalat University or the University of Dalat (formerly Viện Đại học Đà Lạt) is a university in the city of Đà Lạt, Lâm Đồng Province, Vietnam. The original Dalat University was established in 1957 — after support of and requests by Archbishop Pierre Martin Ngô Đình Thục — by the Council of Vietnamese Catholic Bishops as a centre for education. After the Fall of Saigon in 1975, the Vietnamese name was changed to Đại học Đà Lạt (Dalat University). Today, it is a multidisciplinary university that offers undergraduate and graduate education for the Central Highlands region.

Dalat University is in the center of Dalat — a popular tourist city on Lâm Viên Plateau with a year-round cool climate, vast pine forests, flowers, fog, and waterfalls.

The campus sits on a hilly area of 40 hectares north of Xuan Huong Lake, beside an international 18-hole golf course. It is a romantic and beautiful spot. There is a variety of styled buildings hidden throughout the pine trees. The campus offers peace and quiet which is an ideal atmosphere for learning and research.

At present, the university offers over 30 programs at the undergraduate level and a graduate program in Mathematics, Physics, Chemistry, Biology, History, Philology. In addition, a doctoral degree program in Mathematics is offered.

Faculties and departments

Faculties
Maths and IT
Physics
Chemistry
Biology
Letters
History
Foreign Languages
Business Administration
Tourism
Law
Environment Management
Agriculture and Sylviculture
IT
Oriental Study
Sociology and Community Development
 Social Work and Community Development
 Sociology
Pedagogy
Post-graduate
In-service Education

Departments
International Study

Notable alumni 

 Lê Cung Bắc, Film Director
 Nguyễn Đức Quang, Songwriter
Nguyễn Quốc Toản, Founder and CEO of TP&P Technology

External links

Official Website of Dalat University

Universities in Vietnam